Guillaume Chiche (born 30 March 1986) is a French politician who was elected to the French National Assembly on 18 June 2017, representing the department of Deux-Sèvres. He was considered a close ally of President Emmanuel Macron. He was elected as a member of La République En Marche!, but left the party and in May 2020, he was one of the 17 initial members who formed the short-lived Ecology Democracy Solidarity group. Since 2020, he is a member of The New Democrats.

Political career
In parliament, Chiche serves as member of the Committee on Social Affairs. In addition to his committee assignments, he is part of the parliamentary friendship groups with Argentina and Brazil.

In January 2019, Chiche joined the LREM executive board. In that capacity, he shares responsibility with Laurent Saint-Martin for the party's policy planning.

Political positions
In a 2018 parliamentary report, Chiche proposed the abolition of income splitting for the purposes of assessing personal income tax.

In 2019, Chiche led (with Aurore Bergé) a group of LREM members who advocated for broad access to assisted reproductive technology (ART). Unlike Bergé, he supported the authorization of post-mortem ART, a motion which was rejected by a parliamentary majority. 

In July 2019, Chiche decided not to align with his parliamentary group's majority and became one of 52 LREM members who abstained from a vote on the French ratification of the European Union’s Comprehensive Economic and Trade Agreement (CETA) with Canada.

See also
 2017 French legislative election

References

1986 births
Living people
People from Niort
Deputies of the 15th National Assembly of the French Fifth Republic
La République En Marche! politicians
Ecology Democracy Solidarity politicians
Socialist Party (France) politicians
French LGBT rights activists
University of Poitiers alumni
Paris Descartes University alumni
New Democrats politicians